Bolognani is a surname. Notable people with the surname include:

Alessio Bolognani (born 1983), Italian ski jumper
Betty Bolognani (1926–2016), American politician